is a Japanese baseball player. He won a bronze medal at the 1992 Summer Olympics.

External links
Hiroshi Nakamoto Biography and Olympic Results | Olympics at Sports-Reference.com

1966 births
Living people
Baseball players at the 1992 Summer Olympics
Olympic baseball players of Japan
Baseball people from Osaka Prefecture
Olympic medalists in baseball
Baseball players at the 1990 Asian Games
Medalists at the 1992 Summer Olympics
Olympic bronze medalists for Japan
Asian Games competitors for Japan